Andrew Brown (born 20 April 1980, in Pontypool) is a Welsh rugby union player. He played for Cross Keys RFC, Newport RFC and Newport Gwent Dragons. He was released by Newport Gwent Dragons at the end of the 2010–11 season and joined Newport RFC, playing 277 games. Newport RFC hall of fame 2015.

References

External links
Newport Gwent Dragons profile

Rugby union players from Pontypool
Welsh rugby union players
Dragons RFC players
Newport RFC players
Living people
1980 births